Ikh Uul may refer to:

Ikh-Uul, Zavkhan, a sum in western Mongolia
Ikh-Uul, Khövsgöl, a sum in northern Mongolia
Ikh Uul (Khövsgöl Nuur), a peak in the Khoridol Saridag mountains